Patagorhacos is an extinct genus of medium-sized phorusrhacid from the early Miocene of Patagonia. Currently only the single species Patagorhacos terrificus is known, which is represented by two highly fragmentary specimen, one belonging to the back of the skull and the other being the distal end of a leg bone. It was described together with the contemporary rheid Opisthodactylus horacioperezi.

History and naming
Fossil remains of this phorusrhacid have been discovered in  Paso Córdoba, a Natural Protection area in the Rio Negro Province of Argentina. The rocks of the area belong to the Chichinales Formation, which dates to the early Miocene (Colhuehuapian in accordance with South American land mammal age (SALMA) classification. Patagorhacos is known from only two specimens. The holotype (MPCN-PV-377) is the distal end of a right quadrate, while the single referred specimen consists of the distal end of an ulna (MPCN-PV-379). Despite the lack in overlap, the ulna was assigned to Patagorhacos for its presence in the same locality and strata as the holotype quadrate and the fact that its size is consistent with the type specimen.

The name Patagorhacos is a combination of Patagonia and rhacos, which was chosen for its use in the name of the type genus of the family, Phorusrhacos. The species name "terrificus" was chosen to represent the "terrific" nature of phorusrhacids.

Description
The quadrate of Patagorhacos is a robust bone belonging to a medium-sized Phorusrhacid. The body is comparably thin and compressed with strongly concave inner and outer margins. The pterygoid condyle meanwhile is strongly convex and very prominent, with a well-developed egg-shaped fossa on its rostrodorsal edge. In proximity to the condyle and separated by a thin bone wall are two more depressions, likely pneumatic fossae. The cotyle that receives the quadratojugal is deep and ovoid in shape and located above the lateral condyle. Towards the distal end of the bone three condyles can be seen, one medial, one lateral and one caudal, each separated through each other by grooves of varying width and depth.

The ulna referred to Patagorhacos is poorly preserved and suffered heavily from erosion. However, it can be determined that the diaphysis was rather thin and the dorsal condyle well developed. When viewed from the side it's notably less prominent than that of Patagornis, Paraphysornis and Mesembriornis.

Paleoenvironment
Patagorhacos was found in the Patagonian Chichinales Formation, which is mostly known for its fossil mammals. The local fauna includes astrapotheres, the litoptern Cramauchenia, the  notoungulates Colpodon (a leontiniid) and Cochilius volvens (an interatheriid), rodents (Willidewu esteparius and Australoprocta), xenarthrans and borhyaenoids. Bird remains from the formation are comparatively poor. A part of a tibiotarsus has previously been classified as an undetermined species of psilopterine phorusrhacid, a relative of Patagorhacos. Other birds include an undetermined wading bird and Opisthodactylus horacioperezi, a species of rhea. During the Miocene the area likely consisted of open but wooded environment with temperate climate and a proximity to freshwater.

References

Phorusrhacidae
Prehistoric bird genera
Extinct flightless birds
Miocene birds of South America
Colhuehuapian
Neogene Argentina
Fossils of Argentina
Fossil taxa described in 2015
Chichinales Formation